John Elkington Gill (1821–1874) was a 19th-century architect in Bath, Somerset, England.

Life

Gill was born in 1821. He was partnered in the firm, Manners and Gill, with the more famous George Phillips Manners. Gill continued the latter's practice upon Manner's retirement in 1862. Upon Manner's death in 1866, he changed the name of the practice to his name alone. He set up the practice of Gill & Browne in 1874 before he died but he was then mostly retired and the work of Gill & Brown is almost entirely the work of Thomas Browne alone.

Gill lived at 7, Mount Beacon, Bath, from the 1860s.

John Elkington Gill's son was Wallace Gill, who in 1879 had his name added to the practice and in 1899 renamed the practice Gill & Morris. Wallace Gill went by his own name from 1903 and retired in 1909, transferring the practice to Mowbray A. Green.

Architectural practice 
The architectural practice of George Phillips Manners from the early 19th century into the mid 20th century (compiled by Michael Forsyth):

George Phillips Manners: 1820–1845
Manners & Gill: 1845–1866
John Elkington Gill: 1866–1874
Gill & Browne 1874–1879
Browne & Gill: 1879–1899
Gill & Morris: 1899–1903
Wallace Gill: 1903–1909
Mowbray A. Green: 1909–1914
Mowbray A. Green & Hollier: 1914–1947
Frank W. Beresford-Smith: 1947– (and later acquired by Beresford-Smith's son)

From 1846 to 1909, the practice was located at No. 1 Fountain Building.

References 

 H.M. Colvin, A Biographical Dictionary of British Architects, 1600–1840 (1997) 
 Michael Forsyth, Bath, Pevsner Architectural Guides (2003) 

1821 births
1874 deaths
19th-century English architects
Architects from Bath, Somerset
Year of death unknown